Snood is a puzzle video game programmed by Dave Dobson. Snood was released for Mac OS in 1996 as shareware, then for MS-DOS and Microsoft Windows in 1999. An adaptation for Game Boy Advance was developed by Rebellion Developments and released by Destination Software in 2001, and an iOS version was developed by Iron Galaxy and released by EA Mobile on May 8, 2009. Dobson founded Snood, LLC to sell the game.

As in Puzzle Bobble, connecting three or more identical Snoods makes them disappear from the board. When the board is cleared, the level advances. If the Snoods reach the bottom of the screen, a life is lost. Play is not time-limited in most game modes.

A sequel, Snood 2: On Vacation, was developed by Gravity-i and released by Destination Software for Game Boy Advance and Nintendo DS in October 2005 and November 2005 respectively.

Gameplay 
The pieces in the game are called Snoods. There are seven regular Snoods and four Special Snoods. The regular Snoods are Jake (Blue), Midoribe (Green), Mildred (Grey), Spike (Purple), Zod (Red), Geji (Light blue), and Sunny (Yellow).

Each turn, the player launches a Snood of randomly selected color into the playfield. If the Snood lands adjacent to two or more Snoods of the same color, all connecting Snoods of that color vanish and any pieces left unattached beneath the vanished Snoods drop down. The player's score increases with the number of Snoods eliminated. With each Snood launched, a Danger Meter increases and when it reaches the top, all the Snoods in play lower a level. If the Snoods drop past the lowest level of the playing field, the game is over. Releasing Snoods reduces the "Danger Meter".

The first special Snood is called Numbskull. Numbskull is shaped like a human skull and is the one type of Snood that is never launched into play, which means it cannot be joined with other Snoods except Wildcard. If Numbskulls are found at the start of a level, they will have to be isolated and dropped by the player to remove them from the board. If the player loses the game, all the Snoods will turn into Numbskulls, serving as a visual game over message.

The other three special Snood pieces may be launched, and appear at random (and infrequently). One is called Stone which is round and gray, and will always knock out the Snoods adjacent to where it lands. Another is called Wildcard which appears to cycle through all of the regular Snoods and Numbskull and may be used in place of any of them, but if it doesn't join any two or more identical pieces together, it would just drop, and if it joins more than one set of two or more identical pieces, even if each set has different piece from each other, all such sets would be eliminated. The last is called Rowbuilder, a diamond-shaped creature which will fill one row horizontally with like regular Snoods. In the registered game, users may control how frequently these special Snoods appear.

The premise is simple. Unlike Puzzle Bobble, there is no conventional time limit in Snood modes other than Time Attack; however, players must eliminate Snoods efficiently enough to prevent the gradually descending ceiling from crushing them. Many levels also require Snoods to be ricocheted off of walls in order to get them in the appropriate spot, which can be tricky. Snood requires considerable skill at approximating angles as well as strategy.

Awards and recognition 

Steve Wozniak, co-founder of Apple, Inc., lists Snood as one of his favorite games.

Jupiter Media Metrix found in 2001 that Snood was the ninth most-played game with 1.5 million unique users. This is most notable because most of the games on the list came with various versions of Windows (such as the top-ranked game, Solitaire, with 46.7 million users). The "addictive" qualities of the game have been described in an article titled "Snood: At Least It's Not Crack".

Snood received 2004 Shareware Industry Award for Best Game Action/Arcade on July 17, 2004.

Snood has been used regularly by the Ronald McDonald House staff at Stanford University as a tool to teach seriously ill children. It has also been used as palliative for patients who are undergoing chemotherapy, bone marrow transplants and dialysis.

Snood was voted "One of the Top 10 Things on the Web to make you happy", by the Daily News (New York) in April 2009.

References

External links 
 

1996 video games
DOS games
Game Boy Advance games
IOS games
Classic Mac OS games
Android (operating system) games
Puzzle video games
Video game clones
Video games scored by Mark Cooksey
Video games developed in the United States
Windows games
Destination Software games
Works about vacationing
Iron Galaxy games
Single-player video games
Rebellion Developments games